Oracle Linux (abbreviated OL, formerly known as Oracle Enterprise Linux or OEL) is a Linux distribution packaged and freely distributed by Oracle, available partially under the GNU General Public License since late 2006.  It is compiled from Red Hat Enterprise Linux (RHEL) source code, replacing Red Hat branding with Oracle's.  It is also used by Oracle Cloud and Oracle Engineered Systems such as Oracle Exadata and others.

Potential users can freely download Oracle Linux through Oracle's server, or from a variety of mirror sites, and can deploy and distribute it without cost. The company's Oracle Linux Support program aims to provide commercial technical support, covering Oracle Linux and existing RHEL or CentOS installations but without any certification from the former (i.e. without re-installation or re-boot).  Oracle Linux had over 15,000 customers subscribed to the support program.

RHEL compatibility
Oracle Corporation distributes Oracle Linux with two alternative Linux kernels:

 Red Hat Compatible Kernel (RHCK) identical to the kernel shipped in RHEL
 Unbreakable Enterprise Kernel (UEK) based on newer mainline Linux kernel versions, with Oracle's own enhancements for OLTP, InfiniBand, SSD disk access, NUMA-optimizations, Reliable Datagram Sockets (RDS), async I/O, OCFS2, and networking.

Oracle promotes Unbreakable Enterprise Kernel as having 100% compatibility with RHEL.

Hardware compatibility
Oracle Linux is certified on servers including from IBM, Hewlett-Packard, Dell, Lenovo, and Cisco. In 2010, Force10 announced support for Oracle VM Server for x86 and Oracle Linux. Oracle Linux is also available on Amazon EC2 as an Amazon Machine Image, and on Microsoft Windows Azure as a VM Image.

Oracle/Sun servers with x86-64 processors can be configured to ship with Oracle Linux.

In November 2017, Oracle announced Oracle Linux on the ARM platform with support for the Raspberry Pi 3, Cavium ThunderX and X-Gene 3.

Virtualization support
Under the Oracle Linux Support program, Oracle Linux supports KVM, Xen and Openstack .

Other Oracle products are only supported under the Xen-based Oracle VM Server for x86.

Deployment inside Oracle Corporation
Oracle Corporation uses Oracle Linux extensively within Oracle Public Cloud, internally to lower IT costs. Oracle Linux is deployed on more than 42,000 servers by Oracle Global IT; the SaaS Oracle On Demand service, Oracle University, and Oracle's technology demo systems also run Oracle Linux.

Software developers at Oracle develop Oracle Database, Fusion Middleware, E-Business Suite and other components of Oracle Applications on Oracle Linux.

Related products
Oracle Linux is used as the underlying operating system for the following appliances.
 Oracle Exadata
 Oracle Private Cloud Appliance
 Oracle Big Data Appliance
 Oracle Exalytics
 Oracle Database Appliance

Specific additions
 Ksplice – Oracle acquired Ksplice Inc in 2011, and offers Oracle Linux users Ksplice to enable hot kernel patching
 DTrace – , Oracle has begun porting DTrace from Solaris as a Linux kernel module
 Oracle Clusterware – OS-level high availability technology used by Oracle RAC
 Oracle Enterprise Manager – freely available to users with Oracle Linux support subscriptions to manage, monitor, and provision Oracle Linux.
 BTRFS

Benchmark submissions

Sun Fire systems
In March 2012, Oracle submitted a TPC-C benchmark result using an x86 Sun Fire server running Oracle Linux and Unbreakable Enterprise Kernel. With 8 Intel Xeon processors running Oracle DB 11 R2, the system was benchmarked at handling over 5.06 million tpmC (New-Order transactions per minute while fulfilling TPC-C). The server was rated at the time as the third-fastest TPC-C non-clustered system and the fastest x86-64 non-clustered system.

Oracle also submitted a SPECjEnterprise2010 benchmark record using Oracle Linux and Oracle WebLogic Server, and achieved both a single node and an x86 world record result of 27,150 EjOPS (SPECjEnterprise Operation/second).

Cisco UCS systems
Cisco submitted 2 TPC-C benchmark results that run Oracle Linux with the Unbreakable Enterprise Kernel R2 on UCS systems. The UCS systems rank fourth and eighth on the top TPC-C non-clustered list.

SPARC version
In December 2010, Oracle CEO Larry Ellison, in response to a question on Oracle's Linux strategy, said that at some point in the future Oracle Linux would run on Oracle's SPARC platforms. At Oracle OpenWorld 2014 John Fowler, Oracle's Executive Vice President for Systems, also said that Linux will be able to run on SPARC at some point.

In October 2015, Oracle released a Linux reference platform for SPARC systems based on Red Hat Enterprise Linux 6.

In September 2016, Oracle released information about an upcoming product, Oracle Exadata SL6-2, a database server using SPARC processors running Linux.

On 31 March 2017, Oracle posted the first public release of Oracle Linux for SPARC, installable on SPARC T4, T5, M5, and M7 processors. The release notes state that the release is being made available "for the benefit of developers and partners", but is only supported on Exadata SL6 hardware.

Software updates and version history
In March 2012, Oracle announced free software updates and errata for Oracle Linux on Oracle's public yum repositories. In September 2013, Oracle announced that each month its free public yum servers handle 80 TB of data, and the switch to the Akamai content delivery network to handle the traffic growth.

Release history
 Oracle Linux 9, 9.1
 Oracle Linux 8, 8.1, 8.2, 8.3, 8.4, 8.5, 8.6, 8.7
 Oracle Linux 7, 7.1, 7.2, 7.3, 7.4, 7.5, 7.6, 7.7, 7.8, 7.9
 Oracle Linux 6, 6.1, 6.2, 6.3, 6.4, 6.5, 6.6, 6.7, 6.8, 6.9, 6.10
 Oracle Linux 5, 5.1, 5.2, 5.3, 5.4, 5.5, 5.6, 5.7, 5.8, 5.9, 5.10, 5.11
 Oracle Enterprise Linux 4.4, 4.5, 4.6, 4.7, 4.8, 4.9

Oracle Linux uses a version-naming convention identical to that of Red Hat Enterprise Linux (e.g. the first version, Oracle Linux 4.5, is based on RHEL 4.5).

Oracle OpenStack for Oracle Linux
Oracle announced on 24 September 2014 Oracle OpenStack for Oracle Linux distribution which allows users to control Oracle Linux and Oracle VM through OpenStack in production environments. Based on the OpenStack Icehouse release, Oracle OpenStack for Oracle Linux distribution is a cloud management software product that provides an enterprise type solution to deploy and manage the IT environment. The product maintains the flexibility of OpenStack, allowing users to deploy different configurations, and to integrate with different software and hardware vendors. Oracle OpenStack for Oracle Linux is available for free download. There is no licensing cost. It can be downloaded for free from the Oracle web page. Supported OpenStack Services in Version 1 includes Nova, Keystone, Cinder, Glance, Neutron, Horizon and Swift. According to Oracle the support for Oracle OpenStack for Oracle Linux is included as part of Oracle Premier Support for Oracle Linux, Oracle VM, and Systems.

See also

 Oracle Solaris
 Red Hat Enterprise Linux derivatives
 List of commercial products based on Red Hat Enterprise Linux

References

External links

 
 

Enterprise Linux distributions
Oracle software
RPM-based Linux distributions
X86-64 Linux distributions
Linux distributions